Malai is a natural gas field located in Lebap Province of Turkmenistan, on the left bank of Amu Darya River. It has been developed since the 1970s.

The field is currently operated by Türkmengaz Production from Malai field contributes to the overall volume of gas transported via Turkmenistan-China gas pipeline.

See also

Saman-Depe Gas Field
Bagtyýarlyk
Central Asia – China gas pipeline
Ýolöten Gas Field
Dauletabad gas field

References

Natural gas fields in Turkmenistan
Energy in Central Asia
Natural gas fields in the Soviet Union